Shalu Menon is an Indian television and film actress. she has appeared in  advertisements and albums also. She is also a dancer.

Filmography

TV serials

Albums

Personal life 

References

External links 
 
 

Indian television actresses
Living people
Year of birth missing (living people)
Actresses in Malayalam television
Actresses in Tamil television
Actresses in Malayalam cinema